Mniszek  is a village in the administrative district of Gmina Dragacz, within Świecie County, Kuyavian-Pomeranian Voivodeship, in north-central Poland.

About 10,000 Polish civilians were murdered near Mniszek by Germans during the occupation of Poland 1939−1945.

References

Mniszek